"It Was Mighty!" The Early Days of Irish Music in London (TSCD679T) is the first album in the fourth series of The Voice of the People from Topic Records and comprises three CDs.  The selections are taken from Topic Records back catalogue, the Peter Kennedy archive in the British Library and many private collections.

Introduction
Topic records have issued compilations in the series The Voice of the People since 1998.  The compilation has been selected by Dr Reg Hall who has selected all but four of the series so far.  The theme of this and its companion volume, It Was Great Altogether, is the Irish music of London.

Reg Hall in the accompanying booklet defines the London-Irish as a distinct ethnic community of settled migrants and their offspring with topping up from a constant trickle of immigrants from Ireland. On this first compilation most of the musicians were raised in Ireland with a few from London, some of whom travelled to Ireland for holidays.

The Compiler
Reg Hall has been active in Irish music in London since the 1950s, having been invited by Michael Gorman to join his band in 1956.  His involvement in documenting the phenomena continued when he co-produced Paddy in the Smoke with Bill Leader in 1968, recorded in "The Favourite" public house in Holloway, London.  A number of other recordings followed as well as continuing to play in sessions around London.

A large number of the tracks selected feature him providing accompaniment on either piano or keyboard for the dance tunes.

Packaging
The album consists of a cardboard case with a card CD holder for the three CDs and a booklet for the sleeve notes.

Cardboard case
The cardboard case does not detail the tracks in the compilation but does identify all the musicians and in the brief notes explains the place of Irish music in the lives of the migrant population in the 1950s.  The notes then continue to explain that this album covers the period after the 1950s up to the present day.

Booklet
The booklet consists of 100 pages and follows a similar sequence to the other albums in the series.  The booklet was written by Reg Hall, except where stated below.
	"About the Editor" – written by Tony Engle, Managing Director of Topic Records
	"The Voice of the People – The introduction" details the concept and philosophy of the series of compilations and then continues with a history of Irish Music in both Ireland and London.
	"'It was Mighty!' The Early Days of Irish Music in London."  The section details the quote from the musician Gabe O’Sullivan about the music of the 1950s that provides the title of the album and then goes on to detail the wealth of musicmaking in London at the time.
	"Music and dance in Ireland before emigration"
	"Music and dance of the 'London Irish'"
	"Irish traditional music and dance in London after 1945"
	"The Pubs"
	"The Dance Halls"
	"Comhaltas Ceoltóirí Éireann"
	"Recordings and the Media"
	"The Continuing Tradition of Irish music in London"
	CD details. Detailing the content of each of the CDs with biographical notes on each of the performers in track sequence.
	Full track list by CD.
	"British Library", written by Dr Janet Topp Fargion (Lead Curator World and Traditional Music), gives details of the World and Traditional Music Collection and the access available through the internet.  Peter Kennedy's recordings are now held within this archive.

The Recordings
The three CDs cover recordings made between 1948 and 2001. These recordings were made in numerous different locations including Pubs, Stores, various flats and houses, recording studios and Cecil Sharp House the headquarters of the English Folk Dance and Song Society.  Many of the tunes were recorded by people who were only involved with the music but also included many people from the British folk music world, such as Ewan MacColl, Peter Kennedy, Bill Leader, Robin Morton, Peter Bellamy and John Tams.

The CDs

CD1
This CD features recordings made between 1948 and 1972; 10 of the tracks were recorded by Bill Leader in "The Favourite" but do not appear on Paddy in the Smoke.

CD2
This CD features recordings made between 1952 and 1974.

Track 14 features Michael Gorman playing his well-known composition, the jig The Strayaway Child.

CD3
This CD features recordings made between 1957 and 2001.

The musicians in the Hibernian Ceili Band are Brendan McGlinchey(fiddle), Roger Sherlock(flute), Raymond Roland(accordion), Liam Farrell(banjo), PJ Hines(piano), Brian Green(drums)

References

Topic Records albums
2016 compilation albums